The 2011 South Florida Bulls football team represented the University of South Florida (USF) in the 2011 NCAA Division I FBS football season.  The Bulls played their home games at Raymond James Stadium in Tampa, Florida. The 2011 college football season was the 15th season overall for the Bulls, and their seventh season as a member of the Big East Conference.  This was the second season with Skip Holtz as the head coach. They finished the season 5–7, 1–6 in Big East play to finish in a tie for seventh place. USF failed to qualify for a post-season bowl ending its streak of six consecutive bowl trips dating back to 2005.

Schedule

Rankings

References

South Florida Bulls
South Florida Bulls football seasons
South Florida Bulls football